This is a list of film series that have three entries.

0-9

 9½ Weeks
 9½ Weeks (1986)
 Love in Paris (1997) (V) 
 The First 9½ Weeks (1998) (V) (prequel)
 12 Rounds
 12 Rounds (2009)
 12 Rounds 2: Reloaded (2013) (V)
 12 Rounds 3: Lockdown (2015) (V)
 2012
 2012: Doomsday (2008) (V)
 2012: Supernova (2009) (V)
 2012: Ice Age (2011) (V)

A

A Christmas Prince
A Christmas Prince (2017)
A Christmas Prince: The Royal Wedding (2018)
A Christmas Prince: The Royal Baby (2019)
ABCs of Death
The ABCs of Death (2012)
ABCs of Death 2 (2014)
ABC's of Death 2½ (2016)
Abel Gagné
Don't Let It Kill You (1967)
The Old Country Where Rimbaud Died (1977)
Now or Never (1998)
Ace Ventura *
Ace Ventura: Pet Detective (1994)
Ace Ventura: When Nature Calls (1995)
Ace Ventura Jr.: Pet Detective (2009) (TV)
The Adam Trilogy
Yarınsız Adam (aka Man Without Tomorrow) (1976)
Satılmış Adam (aka Sold Man) (1977)
Yıkılmayan Adam (aka Indestructible Man) (1978)
The Addams Family **
The Addams Family (1991)
Addams Family Values (1993)
Addams Family Reunion (1998) (V)
Adventures of a...
Adventures of a Taxi Driver (1976)
Adventures of a Private Eye (1977)
Adventures of a Plumber's Mate (1978)
The Aesop's Fables Maugham Concerto Trilogy
Quartet (1948)
Trio (1950)
Encore (1951)
Aki Kaurismäki's Proletariat Trilogy
Shadows in Paradise (1986)
Ariel (1988)
The Match Factory Girl (1990)
Aktan Abdykalykov Trilogy
Selkynchek (1993)
Beshkempir (1998)
Maimil (2001)
Disney's Aladdin * (a)
Aladdin (1992)
The Return of Jafar (1994) (V)
Aladdin and the King of Thieves (1996) (V)

Alex Cross
Kiss the Girls (1997)
Along Came a Spider (2001)
Alex Cross (2012)
Alex McGregor
First Daughter (1999) (TV)
First Target (2000) (TV)
First Shot (2002) (TV)
Alienation
L'Avventura (1960)
La Notte (1961)
L'Eclisse (1962)
All Dogs Go to Heaven * (A)
All Dogs Go to Heaven (1989)
All Dogs Go to Heaven 2 (1996)
An All Dogs Christmas Carol (1998) (TV)
All of My Heart
All of My Heart (2015) (TV)
All of My Heart: Inn Love (2017) (TV)
All of My Heart: The Wedding (2018) (TV)
Alvin Purple *
Alvin Purple (1973)
Alvin Purple Rides Again (1974)
Melvin, Son of Alvin (1984)
Anchorman
Anchorman: The Legend of Ron Burgundy (2004)
Wake Up, Ron Burgundy: The Lost Movie (2004) (V)
Anchorman 2: The Legend Continues (2013)
The Animation Show
Animation Show: Volume One (2003) (V)
Animation Show: Volume Two (2005) (V)
Animation Show: Volume Three (2007) (V)
Animerama (A)
A Thousand and One Nights (1969)
Cleopatra (1970)
Belladonna of Sadness (1973)
Angels in the Outfield
Angels in the Outfield (1994)
Angels in the Endzone (1997) (TV)
Angels in the Infield (2000) (TV)
The Amazing Spider-Man *
Spider-Man (1977) (TV)
Spider-Man Strikes Back (1978) (TV)
Spider-Man: The Dragon's Challenge (1979) (TV)
The Ape Woman
Captive Wild Woman (1943)
Jungle Woman (1944)
The Jungle Captive (1945)
The Apple Dumpling Gang *
The Apple Dumpling Gang (1975)
The Apple Dumpling Gang Rides Again (1979)
Tales of the Apple Dumpling Gang (1982) (TV)
The Apu Trilogy
Pather Panchali (1955)
Aparajito (1957)
The World of Apu (1959)
Armour of God
Armour of God (1986)
Armour of God II: Operation Condor (1991)
CZ12 (2012)
Arsène Lupin
The Adventures of Arsène Lupin (1957)
Signé Arsène Lupin (1959)
 (1962)
Art of the Devil
Art of the Devil (2004)
Art of the Devil 2 (2005)
Art of the Devil 3 (2008)
The Art of War
The Art of War (2000)
The Art of War II: Betrayal (2008) (V)
The Art of War III: Retribution (2009) (V)
Arthur
Arthur and the Invisibles (2006)
Arthur and the Revenge of Maltazard (2009)
Arthur 3: The War of the Two Worlds (2010)
Asiong Aksaya
Asiong Aksaya (1977)
Awat na, Asiong Aksaya! (1979)
Eto na naman si Asiong Aksaya! (1980)
 Atlas Shrugged
Atlas Shrugged: Part I (2011)
Atlas Shrugged: Part II (2012)
Atlas Shrugged: Part III (2014)
L'Auberge espagnole 
L'Auberge espagnole (2002) 
Les Poupées russes (2005) 
Casse-tête chinois (2013) 
August Underground series
August Underground (2001)
August Underground's Mordum (2003)
August Underground's Penance (2007)
Au Pair
Au Pair (1999) (TV)
Au Pair II: The Fairytale Continues (2001) (TV)
Au Pair 3: Adventure in Paradise (2009) (TV)
Austin Powers
Austin Powers: International Man of Mystery (1997)
Austin Powers: The Spy Who Shagged Me (1999)
Austin Powers in Goldmember (2002)
The Auton Trilogy
Auton (1997) (V)
Auton 2: Sentinel (1998) (V)
Auton 3 (1999) (V)

B

Baaghi
Baaghi (2016)
Baaghi 2 (2018)
Baaghi 3 (2020)
Bab
Bab's Diary (1917)
Bab's Burglar (1917)
Bab's Matinee Idol (1917)
Baby Ama
Bitayin si... Baby Ama! (1976)
Anak ni Baby Ama (1990)
Hari ng Selda: Anak ni Baby Ama 2 (2002)
Back to the Future *
Back to the Future (1985)
Back to the Future Part II (1989)
Back to the Future Part III (1990)
Bad Boys *
Bad Boys (1995)
Bad Boys II (2003)
Bad Boys for Life (2020)
The Bad News Bears *
The Bad News Bears (1976)
The Bad News Bears in Breaking Training (1977)
The Bad News Bears Go to Japan (1978)

Bagdad Cafe *
Sugarbaby (1985)
Bagdad Cafe (1987)
Rosalie Goes Shopping (1989)
Balto (a)
Balto (1995)
Balto II: Wolf Quest (2002) (V)
Balto III: Wings of Change (2004) (V)
Barefoot Gen *
Barefoot Gen (1976)
Barefoot Gen: Explosion of Tears (1977)
Barefoot Gen Part 3: Battle of Hiroshima (1980)
The Barrytown Trilogy
The Commitments (1991)
The Snapper (1993) (TV)
The Van (1996)
Basket Case
Basket Case (1982)
Basket Case 2 (1990)
Basket Case 3: The Progeny (1991)
Batman  **
Batman (1966)
Batman: Return of the Caped Crusaders (2016) (V)
Batman vs. Two-Face (2017) (V)
Batman Unlimited
Batman Unlimited: Animal Instincts (2015) (V)
Batman Unlimited: Monster Mayhem (2015) (V)
Batman Unlimited: Mechs vs. Mutants (2016) (V)
Baywatch
Baywatch the Movie: Forbidden Paradise (1995) (V)
Baywatch: White Thunder at Glacier Bay (1998) (V)
Baywatch: Hawaiian Wedding (2003) (TV)
B.D. - Brigada Diverse
Brigada Diverse în alertă! (1970)
Brigada Diverse intra în actiune (1970)
B.D. la munte si la mare (1971)
Beastmaster *
The Beastmaster (1982)
Beastmaster 2: Through the Portal of Time (1991)
Beastmaster III: The Eye of Braxus (1996) (TV)
Beauty and the Beast * (A)
Beauty and the Beast (1991)
Beauty and the Beast: The Enchanted Christmas (1997) (V)
Beauty and the Beast: Belle's Magical World (1998) (V)

Before Trilogy
Before Sunrise (1995)
Before Sunset (2004)
Before Midnight (2013)
Belle & Sebastian
Belle and Sebastian (2013)
Belle & Sebastian: The Adventure Continues (2015)
 (2018)
A Better Tomorrow
A Better Tomorrow (1986)
A Better Tomorrow II (1987)
A Better Tomorrow III (1989) (prequel)
The Beverly Hillbillies *
Return of the Beverly Hillbillies (1981) (TV)
The Legend of the Beverly Hillbillies (1993) (TV)
The Beverly Hillbilles (1993)
Beverly Hills Chihuahua
Beverly Hills Chihuahua (2008)
Beverly Hills Chihuahua 2 (2011) (V)
Beverly Hills Chihuahua 3: Viva la Fiesta! (2012) (V)
Beverly Hills Cop
Beverly Hills Cop (1984)
Beverly Hills Cop II (1987)
Beverly Hills Cop III (1994)
Beyond the Door
Beyond the Door (1974)
Beyond the Door II (1977) (unofficial)
Beyond the Door III (1989) (unofficial)
Big Momma
Big Momma's House (2000)
Big Momma's House 2 (2006)
Big Mommas: Like Father, Like Son (2011)
Bikini Summer
Bikini Summer (1991)
Bikini Summer II (1992)
Bikini Summer III: South Beach Heat (1997)
Bill & Ted **
Bill & Ted's Excellent Adventure (1989)
Bill & Ted's Bogus Journey (1991)
Bill & Ted Face the Music (2020)
Birdemic
Birdemic: Shock and Terror (2010)
Birdemic 2: The Resurrection (2013)
Birdemic 3: Sea Eagle (2022)
Black Christmas
Black Christmas (1974)
Black X-Mas (2006)
Black Christmas (2019)
The Black Stallion *
The Black Stallion (1979)
The Black Stallion Returns (1983)
The Young Black Stallion (2003) (prequel)
Black Triad Trilogy
Shinjuku Triad Society (1995)
Rainy Dog (1997)
Ley Lines (1999)
Blade *
Blade (1998)
Blade II (2002)
Blade: Trinity (2004)
Blair Witch
The Blair Witch Project (1999)
Book of Shadows: Blair Witch 2 (2000)
Blair Witch (2016)
BloodRayne
BloodRayne (2005)
BloodRayne 2: Deliverance (2007) (V)
BloodRayne: The Third Reich (2011) (V)
The Bloodthirsty Trilogy
The Vampire Doll (1970)
Lake of Dracula (1971)
Evil of Dracula (1974)
The Boogeyman
The Boogeyman (1980)
Boogeyman II (1983) (V)
Return of the Boogeyman (1994) (V)
Boogeyman
Boogeyman (2005)
Boogeyman 2 (2007)
Boogeyman 3 (2008)
Børning
Børning (2014)
Børning 2 (2016)
Børning 3 – Asphalt Burning (2020)
Bourlivé víno
Bourlivé víno (1976)
Zralé víno (1981)
Mladé víno (1986)
The Brady Bunch Movies *
The Brady Bunch Movie (1995)
A Very Brady Sequel (1996)
The Brady Bunch in the White House (2002) (TV)
The Brave Little Toaster
The Brave Little Toaster (1987)
The Brave Little Toaster to the Rescue (1997) (V)
The Brave Little Toaster Goes to Mars (1998) (V)
BRD Trilogy
The Marriage of Maria Braun (1979)
Veronika Voss (1982)
Lola (1981)
Bridget Jones film series
Bridget Jones's Diary (2001)
Bridget Jones: The Edge of Reason (2004)
Bridget Jones's Baby (2016)
Brigade mondaine
Victims of Vice (1978)
Brigade mondaine : La secte de Marrakech (1979)
 (1980)
Brighton Beach
Brighton Beach Memoirs (1986)
Biloxi Blues (1988)
Broadway Bound (1992) (TV)
Broken Arrow *
Broken Arrow (1950)
The Battle at Apache Pass (1952)
Taza, Son of Cochise (1954)
Les Bronzés
Les Bronzés (1978)
Les Bronzés Font du Ski (1979)
Les Bronzés 3: Amis pour la vie (2006)
Brüder
 (2002) (TV)
 (2003) (TV)
 (2006) (TV)
The Butterfly Effect
The Butterfly Effect (2004)
The Butterfly Effect 2 (2006) (V)
The Butterfly Effect 3: Revelations (2009)

C

La Cage aux Folles
La Cage aux Folles (1978)
La Cage aux Folles II (1980)
La Cage aux Folles 3: The Wedding (1985)
Cabin Fever
Cabin Fever (2002)
Cabin Fever 2: Spring Fever (2009)
Cabin Fever: Patient Zero (2014) (prequel)
Caged Heat
Caged Heat (1974)
Caged Heat II: Stripped of Freedom (1994)
Caged Heat 3000 (1995)
The Calcutta Trilogy (Mrinal Sen)
Interview (1971)
Calcutta 71 (1971)
Padatik (The Guerilla Fighter) (1973)
Camping
Camping (2006)
Camping 2 (2010)
Camping 3 (2016)
Ruggero Deodato's Cannibal Trilogy
Ultimo mondo cannibale (1977)
Cannibal Holocaust (1980)
Inferno in diretta (1985)
The Cannonball Run
The Cannonball Run (1981)
Cannonball Run II (1984)
Speed Zone (1989)
Care Bears ** (A) (Theatrical films)
The Care Bears Movie (1985)
Care Bears Movie II: A New Generation (1986)
The Care Bears Adventure in Wonderland (1987)
Cars
Cars (2006)
Cars 2 (2011)
Cars 3 (2017)
Carlos Saura Dance Trilogy
Bodas de sangre (1981)
Carmen (1983)
El amor brujo (1986)
Carnosaur
Carnosaur (1993)
Carnosaur 2 (1995)
Carnosaur 3: Primal Species (1996) (V)
La Casa
La Casa 3 (1988)
La Casa 4 (1988)
La Casa 5 (1990)
Casino Raiders
Casino Raiders (1989)
No Risk, No Gain: Casino Raiders - The Sequel (1990)
Casino Raiders II (1993)
Cat Stevens & Hutch Bessy
Dio perdona... Io no! (1967)
I quattro dell'Ave Maria (1968)
La collina degli stivali (1969)
John Ford's Cavalry Trilogy
Fort Apache (1948)
She Wore a Yellow Ribbon (1949)
Rio Grande (1950)
Chameleon
Chameleon (1998) (TV)
Chameleon II: Death Match (1999) (TV)
Chameleon 3: Dark Angel (2000) (TV)
Champignol
 (1957)
 (1959)
 (1966)
Charles Bind
Number One of the Secret Service (1977)
Licensed to Love and Kill (1979)
Number One Gun (1980)
Charles Vine
Licensed to Kill (1965)
Where the Bullets Fly (1966)
Somebody's Stolen Our Russian Spy (1967)
Charlie's Angels **
Charlie's Angels (2000)
Charlie's Angels: Full Throttle (2003)
Charlie's Angels (2019)
The Cheetah Girls
The Cheetah Girls (2003) (TV)
The Cheetah Girls 2 (2006) (TV)
The Cheetah Girls: One World (2008) (TV)
Center Stage
Center Stage (2000)
Center Stage: Turn It Up (2008)
Center Stage: On Pointe (2016) (TV)
A Chinese Odyssey *
A Chinese Odyssey Part One: Pandora's Box (1994)
A Chinese Odyssey Part Two: Cinderella (1994)
A Chinese Odyssey Part Three (2016)
Christmas in Evergreen
Christmas in Evergreen (2017) (TV)
Christmas in Evergreen: Letters to Santa (2018) (TV)
Christmas in Evergreen: Tidings of Joy (2018) (TV)
Chronicle Mysteries
Chronicle Mysteries: Recovered (2019) (TV)
Chronicle Mysteries: The Wrong Man (2019) (TV)
Chronicle Mysteries: Vines that Bind (2019) (TV)
The Chronicles of Narnia
The Chronicles of Narnia: The Lion, the Witch and the Wardrobe (2005)
The Chronicles of Narnia: Prince Caspian (2008)
The Chronicles of Narnia: The Voyage of the Dawn Treader (2010)
The Chronicles of Riddick
Pitch Black (2000)
The Chronicles of Riddick (2004)
Riddick (2013)
Cinderella
Cinderella (1950)
Cinderella II: Dreams Come True (2002)
Cinderella III: A Twist in Time (2007)

The Circuit
The Circuit (2002)
The Circuit 2: The Final Punch (2002) (V)
The Circuit III: Final Flight (2006) (V)
Cirkeline
 (1998)
 (2000)
 (2004)
 Per Fly's Class Trilogy
Bænken (2000)
Arven (2003)
Drabet (2005)
Mark L. Lester's Class of 19XX
Class of 1984 (1982)
Class of 1999 (1990)
Class of 1999 II: The Substitute (1994)
Class Reunion
Class Reunion (2016)
Klassikokkutulek 2: Pulmad ja matused (2018)
Klassikokkutulek 3: Ristiisad (2019)
Cleopatra Wong and Dynamite Johnson
They Call Her Cleopatra Wong (1978)
Dynamite Johnson (1978)
Pay or Die a.k.a. Devil's Three (1979)
Cloverfield
Cloverfield (2008)
10 Cloverfield Lane (2016)
The Cloverfield Paradox (2018) (V)
Codename: Kids Next Door *
Codename: Kids Next Door - Operation Z.E.R.O. (2006) (TV)
The Grim Adventures of the Kids Next Door (2007) (TV)
Codename: Kids Next Door - Operation: I.N.T.E.R.V.I.E.W.S. (2008)
Code Name: Wild Geese
Code Name: Wild Geese (1984)
Commando Leopard (1985)
 (1988)
Le Cœur Des Hommes
Le Cœur des hommes (2003)
 (2007)
 (2013)
Coffin' Joe
At Midnight I'll Take Your Soul (1964)
This Night I Will Possess Your Corpse (1967)
Embodiment of Evil (2008)
Cold Prey
Cold Prey (2006)
Cold Prey 2 (2008)
Cold Prey 3 (2010) (prequel)
Hou Hsiao-hsien's Coming-of-Age Trilogy
A Summer at Grandpa's (1984)
The Time to Live and the Time to Die (1985)
Dust in the Wind (film) (1986)
Commando
Commando: A One Man Army (2013)
Commando 2: The Black Money Trail (2017)
Commando 3 (2019)
Cotton Comes to Harlem
Cotton Comes to Harlem (1970)
Come Back, Charleston Blue (1972)
A Rage in Harlem (1991)
The Count of Monte Cristo
The Count of Monte Cristo (1934)
The Son of Monte Cristo (1940)
The Return of Monte Cristo (1946)
Count Bobby
The Adventures of Count Bobby (1961)
The Sweet Life of Count Bobby (1962)
Count Bobby, The Terror of The Wild West (1965)
 Crackerjack
Crackerjack (1994)
Crackerjack 2 (1996)
Crackerjack 3 (2000)
The Creature from the Black Lagoon
Creature from the Black Lagoon (1954)
Revenge of the Creature (1955)
The Creature Walks Among Us (1956)
Creepshow
Creepshow (1982)
Creepshow 2 (1987)
Creepshow III (2006) (unofficial) (V)
Crocodile Dundee
Crocodile Dundee (1986)
Crocodile Dundee II (1988)
Crocodile Dundee in Los Angeles (2001)
Cruel Intentions
Cruel Intentions (1999)
Cruel Intentions 2: Manchester Prep (2000) (V) (prequel)
Cruel Intentions 3 (2004) (V)
Cube
Cube (1997)
Cube 2: Hypercube (2002)
Cube Zero (2004) (prequel)
Albert Pyun's Cyborg Trilogy
Cyborg (1989)
Knights (1993) (V) 
Omega Doom (1996) (V) 
Cyborg
Cyborg (1989)
Cyborg 2 (1993) (V)
Cyborg 3: The Recycler (1994) (V)
Cyborg Cop
Cyborg Cop (1993) (V)
Cyborg Cop II (1994) (V)
Cyborg Cop III (1995) (V)

D

Dabangg
Dabangg (2010)
Dabangg 2 (2012)
Dabangg 3 (2019)
Deep Blue Sea
Deep Blue Sea (1999)
Deep Blue Sea 2 (2018) (V)
Deep Blue Sea 3 (2020) (V)
Daddy Day Care
Daddy Day Care (2003)
Daddy Day Camp (2007)
Grand-Daddy Day Care (2019) (V)
Daimajin
Daimajin (1966)
Wrath of Daimajin (1966)
Return of Daimajin (1966)
Dallas **
Dallas: The Early Years (1986) (TV)
Dallas: J.R. Returns (1996) (TV)
Dallas: War of the Ewings (1998) (TV)
Dancing Master
Dancing Master (1979)
Superhand: Shadow of the Dancing Master (1980)
Dancing Master 2: Macao Connection (1982)
Dandupalya
Dandupalya (2012)
Dandupalya 2 (2017)
Dandupalya 3 (2018)
The Dark Knight Trilogy
Batman Begins (2005)
The Dark Knight (2008)
The Dark Knight Rises (2012)
Darkman
Darkman (1990)
Darkman II: The Return of Durant (1995) (V)
Darkman III: Die Darkman Die (1996) (V)
Darrow & Darrow
Darrow & Darrow (2017) (TV)
In the Key of Murder (2018) (TV)
Body of Evidence (2018) (TV)
Dasan and Vijayan
Nadodikkattu (1987)
Pattanapravesham (1988)
Akkareyakkareyakkare (1990)
Days of Being Wild
Days of Being Wild (1991)
In the Mood for Love (2000)
2046 (2004)
Dead series remakes
Night of the Living Dead (1990)
Dawn of the Dead (2004)
Day of the Dead (2008) (V)
Dead or Alive
Dead or Alive: Hanzaisha (1999)
Dead or Alive 2: Tôbôsha (2000)
Dead or Alive: Final (2002)
Dear Caroline
Dear Caroline (1951)
 (1953)
Caroline and the Rebels (1955)
Dear Ruth
Dear Ruth (1947)
Dear Wife (1949)
Dear Brat (1951)
Death Note
Death Note (2006)
Death Note: The Last Name (2007)
L Change the WorLd (2008)
Gus Van Sant's Death Trilogy
Gerry (2002)
Elephant (2003)
Last Days (2005)
The Decline of Western Civilization
The Decline of Western Civilization (1981)
The Decline of Western Civilization Part II: The Metal Years (1988)
The Decline of Western Civilization III (1998)
The Defenders **
The Defenders: Payback (1997) (TV)
The Defenders: Choice of Evils (1998) (TV)
The Defenders: Taking the First (1998) (TV)
The Delta Force
The Delta Force (1986)
Delta Force 2: The Colombian Connection (1990)
Delta Force 3: The Killing Game (1991) (V)
Demons
Dèmoni (1985) (aka Demons)
Dèmoni 2 (1986) (aka Demons 2)
Dèmoni 3 (1991) (aka Demons 3, Black Demons, The Church)
Descendants **
Descendants (2015) (TV)
Descendants 2 (2017) (TV)
Descendants 3 (2019) (TV)
Luca Guadagnino's Desire Trilogy
I Am Love (2009)
A Bigger Splash (2015)
Call Me by Your Name (2017)
Detective Dee
Detective Dee and the Mystery of the Phantom Flame (2010)
Young Detective Dee: Rise of the Sea Dragon (2013) (prequel)
Detective Dee: The Four Heavenly Kings (2018) (prequel)
Deuxième Bureau
 (1956)
 (1957)
 (1958)
Dexter Riley
The Computer Wore Tennis Shoes (1969)
Now You See Him, Now You Don't (1972)
The Strongest Man in the World (1975)
Dhamaal
Dhamaal (2007)
Double Dhamaal (2011)
Total Dhamaal (2019)
Dhoom
Dhoom (2004)
Dhoom 2 (2006)
Dhoom 3 (2013)
Dibu *
Dibu: La película (1997)
Dibu 2: La venganza de Nasty (1998)
Dibu 3 (2002)
Dick Barton *
Dick Barton: Special Agent (1948)
Dick Barton Strikes Back (1949)
Dick Barton at Bay (1950)
Dinocroc vs. Supergator
Dinocroc (2004)
Supergator (2007) (V)
Dinocroc vs. Supergator (2010) (TV)
The Divergent Series
Divergent (2014)
The Divergent Series: Insurgent (2015)
The Divergent Series: Allegiant (2016)
Fritz Lang's Dr. Mabuse Trilogy
Dr. Mabuse the Gambler (1922)
The Testament of Dr. Mabuse (1933)
The Thousand Eyes of Dr. Mabuse (1960)
Driller Killer
The Driller Killer (1979)
Driller Killer E2 (2012)
Detroit Driller Killer (2020)
Doctor Who
The Name of the Doctor (2013) (TV)
The Day of the Doctor (2013) (TV)
The Time of the Doctor (2013) (TV)
Dollars Trilogy
A Fistful of Dollars (1964)
For a Few Dollars More (1965)
The Good, the Bad and the Ugly (1966) (prequel)
Whit Stillman's "Doomed-Bourgeois-in-Love" series
Metropolitan (1990)
Barcelona (1994)
The Last Days of Disco (1998)
Dr. Fu Manchu (Warner Oland series)
The Mysterious Dr. Fu Manchu (1929)
The Return of Dr. Fu Manchu (1930)
Daughter of the Dragon (1931)
Dr. Goldfoot and Franco and Ciccio
Dr. Goldfoot and the Bikini Machine (1965)
Two Mafiosi Against Goldginger (1965)
Dr. Goldfoot and the Girl Bombs (1966)
Dr. John Luke and the Wyatt Quintuplets
The Country Doctor (1936)
Reunion (1936)
Five of a Kind (1938)
Dracula 2000
Dracula 2000 (2000)
Dracula II: Ascension (2003) (V)
Dracula III: Legacy (2005) (V)
Drake & Josh *
Drake & Josh Go Hollywood (2006) (TV)
Drake & Josh: Really Big Shrimp (2007) (TV)
Merry Christmas, Drake & Josh (2008) (TV)
Duma o Kovpake
Duma o Kovpake: Nabat (1973)
Duma o Kovpake: Buran (1975)
Duma o Kovpake: Karpaty, Karpaty... (1976)
Dumb and Dumber *
Dumb and Dumber (1994)
Dumb and Dumberer: When Harry Met Lloyd (2003) (prequel)
Dumb and Dumber To (2014)
Dungeons & Dragons film series
Dungeons & Dragons (2000)
Dungeons & Dragons: Wrath of the Dragon God (2005)
Dungeons & Dragons: The Book of Vile Darkness (2012)

Dynasty ***
Dynasty: The Reunion (1991) (TV)
Dynasty: The Making of a Guilty Pleasure (2005) (TV)
Dynasty Reunion: Catfights & Caviar (2006) (TV)

E

 Eastrail 177 Trilogy
Unbreakable (2000)
Split (2016)
Glass (2019)
The Elements Trilogy
Fire (1996)
Earth (1998)
Water (2005)
Elvis Gratton *
Elvis Gratton: Le king des kings (1985)
Elvis Gratton II: Miracle à Memphis (1999)
Elvis Gratton 3: Le retour d'Elvis Wong (2004)
Emil i Lönneberga
Emil i Lönneberga (1971)
Nya hyss av Emil i Lönneberga (1972)
Emil and the Piglet (1973)
Emma Fielding
Site Unseen (2017) (TV)
Past Malice (2018) (TV)
More Bitter than Death (2019) (TV)
Entrails of a Virgin
Entrails of a Virgin (1986)
Entrails of a Beautiful Woman (1986)
Female Inquisitor (1987)
 Erkan & Stefan
 (2000)
 (2002)
 (2005)
Erotic Ghost Story
Erotic Ghost Story (1987)
Erotic Ghost Story II (1993)
Erotic Ghost Story III (1994)
Escape Plan
Escape Plan (2013)
Escape Plan 2: Hades (2018) (V)
Escape Plan: The Extractors (2019) (V)
The Europa Trilogy
The Element of Crime (1984)
Epidemic (1988)
Europa (1991)
Evil Born
11/11/11 (2011) (V)
12/12/12 (2012)
13/13/13 (2013)
The Eye
The Eye (2002)
The Eye 2 (2004)
The Eye 10 (2005)
Eyyvah Eyvah
Eyyvah Eyvah (2010)
Eyyvah Eyvah 2 (2011)
Eyyvah Eyvah 3 (2014)

F

 Family of Cops 
 Family of Cops (1995) (TV)
 Breach of Faith: A Family of Cops 2 (1997) (TV)
 Family of Cops 3 (1999) (TV)
 Fack ju Göhte (Germany)
 Fack ju Göhte (2013)
 Fack ju Göhte 2 (2015)
 Fack ju Göhte 3 (2017)
Free Willy *
Free Willy (1993)
Free Willy 2: The Adventure Home (1995)
Free Willy 3: The Rescue (1997)
The Fairly OddParents
A Fairly Odd Movie: Grow Up, Timmy Turner! (2011) (TV)
A Fairly Odd Christmas (2012) (TV)
A Fairly Odd Summer (2014) (TV)
Familien Gyldenkål
Familien Gyldenkål (1975)
Familien Gyldenkål sprænger banken (1976)
Familien Gyldenkål vinder valget (1977)
Fantômas
Fantômas (1964)
Fantômas se déchaîne (1965)
Fantômas contre Scotland Yard (1967)
Fast
Fast Company
Fast and Loose
Fast and Furious
Fatal Fury
Fatal Fury: Legend of the Hungry Wolf (1992) (TV)
Fatal Fury: The Motion Picture (1994)
Fatal Fury 2: The New Battle (1993) (TV)
Fate/stay night: Heaven's Feel (A)
Fate/stay night: Heaven's Feel I. presage flower (2017)
Fate/stay night: Heaven's Feel II. lost butterfly (2019)
Fate/stay night: Heaven's Feel III. spring song (2020)
Father Christmas
Finding Father Christmas (2016) (TV)
Engaging Father Christmas (2017) (TV)
Marrying Father Christmas (2018) (TV)
The Fear Street Trilogy
Fear Street Part One: 1994 (2021)
Fear Street Part Two: 1978 (2021)
Fear Street Part Three: 1666 (2021)
Feast
Feast (2005)
Feast 2: Sloppy Seconds (2008) 
Feast III: The Happy Finish (2009) (V)
Fifty Shades
Fifty Shades of Grey (2015)
Fifty Shades Darker (2017)
Fifty Shades Freed (2018)
Fight Back to School
Fight Back to School (1991)
Fight Back to School II (1992)
Fight Back to School III (1993)
Firefly
House of 1000 Corpses (2003)
The Devil's Rejects (2005)
3 from Hell (2019)
A Fixer Upper Mystery
Framed For Murder (2017) (TV)
Concrete Evidence (2017) (TV)
Deadly Deed (2018) (TV)
Flåklypa Grand Prix
Flåklypa Grand Prix (1975)
 (1998)
 (2013)
Flash Gordon (serials)
Flash Gordon (1936)
Flash Gordon's Trip to Mars (1938)
Flash Gordon Conquers the Universe (1940)
The Flesh Trilogy
The Touch of Her Flesh (1967)
The Kiss of Her Flesh (1968)
The Curse of Her Flesh (1968)
Flicka
Flicka (2006)
Flicka 2 (2010) (V)
Flicka: Country Pride (2012) (V)
Flodder *
Flodder (1986)
Flodders in America (1992)
Flodder 3 (1995)
Flower Shop Mystery
Mum's the Word (2016) (TV)
Snipped in the Bud (2016) (TV)
Dearly Depotted (2016) (TV)
The Fly (1958 series)
The Fly (1958)
Return of the Fly (1959)
Curse of the Fly (1965)
Foster's Home for Imaginary Friends *
Foster's Home for Imaginary Friends - House of Bloo's (2004) (TV)
Foster's Home for Imaginary Friends - Good Wilt Hunting (2006) (TV)
Foster's Home for Imaginary Friends - Destination Imagination (2008) (TV)
Freaky Friday
Freaky Friday (1976)
Summer Switch (1984) (TV)
A Billion for Boris (1984) (TV)

Fred *
Fred: The Movie (2010) (TV)
Fred 2: Night of the Living Fred (2011) (TV)
Fred 3: Camp Fred (2012) (TV)
Free! (A)
Free! Timeless Medley: The Bond (2017)
Free! Timeless Medley: The Promise (2017)
Free! Take Your Marks (2017)
The French Connection
The French Connection (1971)
French Connection II (1975)
Popeye Doyle (1986) (TV)
Friday
Friday (1995)
Next Friday (2000)
Friday After Next (2002)
Friendship Trilogy
Dil Chahta Hai (2001)
Rock On!! (2008)
Zindagi Na Milegi Dobara (2010)
From Dusk till Dawn *
From Dusk Till Dawn (1996)
From Dusk Till Dawn 2: Texas Blood Money (1999)
From Dusk Till Dawn 3: The Hangman's Daughter (2000) (prequel)
Furyô banchô: Inoshika Ochô
Furyô banchô: Inoshika Ochô (1969)
Furyô anego den: Inoshika Ochô (1973)
Yasagure anego den: sôkatsu rinchi (1973)

G

Garfield  *
Garfield Gets Real (2007) (V)
Garfield's Fun Fest (2008) (V)
Garfield's Pet Force (2009) (V)
Gas House Kids
Gas House Kids (1946)
Gas House Kids Go West (1947)
Gas House Kids in Hollywood (1947)
General's Son
General's Son (1990)
General's Son II (1991)
General's Son III (1992)
Georges Masse
Mission à Tanger (1949)
Méfiez-vous des blondes (1950)
Massacre en dentelles (1952)
The German Trilogy (Luchino Visconti)
The Damned (1969)
Death in Venice (1971)
Ludwig (1972)
Get Married
Get Married (2007)
Get Married 2 (2009)
Get Married 3 (2011)
Ghostbusters **
Ghostbusters (1984)
Ghostbusters II (1989)
Ghostbusters: Afterlife (2021)

G.I. Joe
G.I. Joe: The Movie (1987) (V)
G.I. Joe: Spy Troops (2003) (V)
G.I. Joe: Valor vs. Venom (2004) (V)
Gilligan's Island ***
Rescue from Gilligan's Island (1978) (TV)
The Castaways on Gilligan's Island (1979) (TV)
The Harlem Globetrotters on Gilligan's Island (1981) (TV)
Ginger
Ginger (1971)
The Abductors (1972)
Girls Are for Loving (1973)
Ginger Snaps
Ginger Snaps (2000)
Ginger Snaps 2: Unleashed (2004)
Ginger Snaps Back: The Beginning (2004) (prequel)
Goal!
Goal (2005)
Goal II: Living the Dream (2007)
Goal III: Taking on the World (2009) (V)
The Godfather
The Godfather (1972)
The Godfather Part II (1974)
The Godfather Part III (1990)
Golden Chicken
Golden Chicken (2002)
Golden Chicken 2 (2003)
Golden Chicken 3 (2014)
Lars von Trier's The Golden Heart
Breaking the Waves (1996)
The Idiots (1998)
Dancer in the Dark (2000)
Goldy
Goldy: The Last of the Golden Bears (1984)
Goldy 2: The Saga of the Golden Bear (1986)
The Magic of the Golden Bear: Goldy III (1994)
Gone in 60 Seconds
Gone in 60 Seconds (1974)
The Junkman (1982)
Deadline Auto Theft (1983)
Goodnight for Justice
Goodnight for Justice (2011) (TV)
The Measure of a Man (2012) (TV)
Queen of Hearts (2013) (TV)
Goopy Gyne Bagha Byne
Goopy Gyne Bagha Byne (1968)
Heerak Rajar Deshe (1980)
Goopy Bagha Phire Elo (1991)
G.O.R.A.
G.O.R.A. (2004)
A.R.O.G. (2008)
Arif V 216 (2018)
Le Gorille *
Le Gorille vous salue bien (1958)
 (1959)
 (1963)
Göta kanal
Göta kanal eller Vem drog ur proppen? (1981)
Göta kanal 2 - Kanalkampen (2006)
Göta kanal 3 - Kanalkungens hemlighet (2009)
Graceland
Christmas at Graceland (2018) (TV)
Wedding at Graceland (2019) (TV)
Christmas at Graceland: Home for the Holidays (2019) (TV)
Green Street (Hooligans)
Green Street (2005)
Green Street 2: Stand Your Ground (2009)
Green Street 3: Never Back Down (2013)
Guns of El Chupacabra
Guns of El Chupacabra (1997) (V)
Guns of El Chupacabra II: The Unseen (1998) (V)
El Chupacabra (2003) (V)

H

Ha-Chayim Al-Pi Agfa
Ha-Chayim Al-Pi Agfa (1992)
Smicha Hashmalit Ushma Moshe (1995)
Mar Baum (1997)
Hanni & Nanni
Hanni & Nanni (2010)
 (2012)
 (2013)
Hal Roach's Streamliners-Western trilogy
Dudes Are Pretty People (1942)
Calaboose (1943)
Prairie Chickens (1943)
Hanzo 'The Razor' Itami (aka Goyôkiba)
Goyôkiba (1972)
Goyôkiba: Kamisori Hanzô jigoku zeme (1973)
Goyôkiba: Oni no Hanzô yawahada koban (1974)
The Hangover
The Hangover (2009)
The Hangover Part II (2011)
The Hangover Part III (2013)
The Happy Hooker
The Happy Hooker (1975)
The Happy Hooker Goes to Washington (1977)
The Happy Hooker Goes Hollywood (1980)
Hard Time
Hard Time (1998) (TV)
The Premonition (1999) (TV)
Hostage Hotel (1999) (TV)
Harihar Nagar
In Harihar Nagar (1990)
2 Harihar Nagar (2009)
In Ghost House Inn (2010)
Harold & Kumar
Harold & Kumar Go to White Castle (2004)
Harold & Kumar Escape from Guantanamo Bay (2008)
A Very Harold & Kumar 3D Christmas (2011)
Has Fallen
Olympus Has Fallen (2013)
London Has Fallen (2016)
Angel Has Fallen (2019)
Heintje
Heintje - Ein Herz geht auf Reisen (1969)
Heintje - Einmal wird die Sonne wieder scheinen (1970)
Heintje - Mein bester Freund (1970)
Hej Stine!
Hej Stine! (1970)
I din fars lomme (1973)
Sådan er jeg osse (1980)
Helga
Helga – Vom Werden des menschlichen Lebens (1967)
Helga und Michael (1968)
Helga und die Männer - Die sexuelle Revolution (1969)
Hell House LLC
Hell House LLC (2015)
Hell House LLC 2: The Abaddon Hotel (2018) (TV)
Hell House LLC III: Lake of Fire (2019) (TV)
He-Man and the Masters of the Universe * (A) (1985 series)
He-Man and She-Ra: The Secret of the Sword (1985) (TV)
He-Man and She-Ra: A Christmas Special (1985) (TV)
Skeletor's Revenge (1986) (V)
The Henrietta
The Lamb (1915)
The Mollycoddle (1920)
The Saphead (1920)
Her Fatal Ways
Her Fatal Ways (1990)
Her Fatal Ways II (1991)
Her Fatal Ways III (1993)
Hexen bis aufs Blut gequält
Hexen bis aufs Blut gequält (1970)
Hexen geschändet und zu Tode gequält (1973)
Mark of the Devil 666: The Moralist (1995)
The Hitcher
The Hitcher (1986)
The Hitcher II: I've Been Waiting (2003) (V)
The Hitcher (2007)
The Hobbit
The Hobbit: An Unexpected Journey (2012)
The Hobbit: The Desolation of Smaug (2013)
The Hobbit: The Battle of the Five Armies (2014)
Honey, I Shrunk the Kids *
Honey, I Shrunk the Kids (1989)
Honey, I Blew Up the Kid (1992)
Honey, We Shrunk Ourselves (1997) (V)
Hostel
Hostel (2005)
Hostel: Part II (2007)
Hostel: Part III (2011) (V)
How to Train Your Dragon ** (A)
How to Train Your Dragon (2010)
How to Train Your Dragon 2 (2014)
How to Train Your Dragon: The Hidden World (2019)
The Human Centipede
The Human Centipede (First Sequence) (2009)
The Human Centipede 2 (Full Sequence) (2011)
The Human Centipede 3 (Final Sequence) (2015)
The Human Condition
No Greater Love (1959)
Road to Eternity (1959)
A Soldier's Prayer (1961)
Hustruer
Hustruer (1975)
Hustruer - ti år etter (1985)
Hustruer III (1996)

I

I Know What You Did Last Summer
I Know What You Did Last Summer (1997)
I Still Know What You Did Last Summer (1998)
I'll Always Know What You Did Last Summer (2006) (V)
I Love a Mystery
I Love a Mystery (1945)
The Devil's Mask (1946)
The Unknown (1946)
I mostri
I mostri (1963)
I nuovi mostri (1977)
I mostri oggi (2009)
In the Heat of the Night *
In the Heat of the Night (1967)
They Call Me MISTER Tibbs! (1970)
The Organization (1971)
In Wahrheit
 (2017) (TV)
 (2018) (TV)
In Wahrheit: Still ruht der See (2019) (TV)
Indecent Behavior
Indecent Behavior (1993)
Indecent Behavior II (1994)
Indecent Behavior III (1995)
Infernal Affairs
Infernal Affairs (2002)
Infernal Affairs II (2003) (prequel)
Infernal Affairs III (2003)
Inspector Balram
Aavanazhi (1986)
Inspector Balram (1991)
Balram vs. Tharadas (2006)
Inspector Hornleigh
Inspector Hornleigh (1939)
Inspector Hornleigh on Holiday (1939)
Inspector Hornleigh Goes to It (1941)
Inspecteur Sergil
Inspecteur Sergil (1947)
Sergil et le dictateur (1948)
Sergil chez les filles (1952)
Inspector Bo Jarnebring **
The Man from Majorca (1984)
 (1986)
 (1994) (TV)
I soliti ignoti
I soliti ignoti (1958)
Audace colpo dei soliti ignoti (1960)
I soliti ignoti vent'anni dopo (1985)
Renato Castellani's Italian neorealism trilogy
Under the Sun of Rome (aka Sotto il sole di Roma) (1948)
È primavera... (1950)
Two Cents Worth of Hope (aka Due Soldi di Speranza) (1950)
It's Alive
It's Alive (1974)
It Lives Again (1978)
It's Alive III: Island of the Alive (1987)
Ivan Groznyy
Ivan Groznyy I (1944)
Ivan Groznyy II: Boyarsky zagovor (1958)
Ivan Groznyy III (1988)
Ivan Tsarevich and the Gray Wolf (A)
Ivan Tsarevich and the Gray Wolf (2011)
Ivan Tsarevich and the Gray Wolf (2013)
Ivan Tsarevich and the Gray Wolf (2016)

J

Jeff Gordon
Des frissons partout (1963)
 (1964)
Ces dames s'en mêlent (1965)
Jeg - en kvinde
Jeg - en kvinde (1965)
Jeg, en kvinda II (1968)
3 slags kærlighed (1970)
Je hais...
Je hais les enfants (2003) (TV)
Je hais les parents (2005) (TV)
 (2006) (TV)
Jesse James (Republic serials)
Jesse James Rides Again (1947)
Adventures of Frank and Jesse James (1948)
The James Brothers of Missouri (1949)
Jiang tou
Jiang tou (1975)
Gou hun jiang tou (1976)
Ratu ilmu hitam (1979)
The Jimmy Timmy Power Hour
The Jimmy Timmy Power Hour (2004) (TV)
The Jimmy Timmy Power Hour 2: When Nerds Collide (2006) (TV)
The Jimmy Timmy Power Hour 3: The Jerkinators (2006) (TV)
João de Deus
Recordações da Casa Amarela (1989)
A Comédia de Deus (1995)
As Bodas de Deus (1999)
John Alexander
Force of Execution (2013)
A Good Man (2014) (prequel)
Absolution (2015)
John Woo's Once a Thief 
Once a Thief (1996) (TV)
Once a Thief: Brother Against Brother (1997) (TV)
Once a Thief: Family Business (1998) (TV)
Johnny English
Johnny English (2003)
Johnny English Reborn (2011)
Johnny English Strikes Again (2018)
Jonny Quest **
Jonny's Golden Quest (1993) (TV)
Jonny Quest vs. The Cyber Insects (1995) (TV)
Tom and Jerry: Spy Quest (2015) (V)*

Joy Ride
Joy Ride (2001)
Joy Ride 2: Dead Ahead (2008) (V)
Joy Ride 3: Roadkill (2014) (V)
Rudyard Kipling's The Jungle Book (live-action series)
Rudyard Kipling's The Jungle Book (1994)
Rudyard Kipling's The Second Jungle Book: Mowgli and Baloo (1996)
Rudyard Kipling's The Jungle Book: Mowgli's Story (1998) (TV)
Jungledyret * (A)
Jungledyret (1993)
Jungledyret 2 - den store filmhelt (1996)
Jungledyret Hugo: Fræk, flabet og fri (2007)

K

Kakababu
Mishawr Rawhoshyo (2013)
Yeti Obhijaan (2017)
Kakababur Protyaborton (2019)
The Karnstein Trilogy
The Vampire Lovers (1970)
Lust for a Vampire (1971)
Twins of Evil (1972)
Kasargod Khader Bhai
Mimics Parade (1991)
Kasargod Khader Bhai (1992)
Again Kasargod Khader Bhai (2010)
Kate Kirby
Chelsea 7750 (1913)
An Hour Before Dawn (1913)
The Port of Doom (1913)
Kekec
Kekec (1951)
Srecno Kekec (1963)
Kekceve ukane (1968)
The Kent Family Chronicles (aka The Bicentennial Series)
The Bastard (1978) (TV)
The Rebels (1979) (TV)
The Seekers (1979) (TV)
Kerberos Saga - Kerberos arc (a)
The Red Spectacles (1987)
StrayDog: Kerberos Panzer Cops (1991)
Jin-Roh: The Wolf Brigade (1999)
Kerubin
Kerubin (1952)
Tulisang Pugot (1953)
Nagkita si Kerubin at si Tulisang Pugot (1954)
Kevade
Kevade (1969)
Suvi (1976)
Sügis (1990)
KiDULTHOOD
KiDULTHOOD (2006)
AdULTHOOD (2008)
Brotherhood (2016)
Kingsman
Kingsman: The Secret Service (2014)
Kingsman: The Golden Circle (2017)
The King's Man (2021) (prequel)
Kirikou (A) *
Kirikou and the Sorceress (1998)
Kirikou and the Wild Beasts (2005)
Kirikou and the Men and Women (2012)
The Kissing Booth film series
The Kissing Booth (2018)
The Kissing Booth 2 (2020)
The Kissing Booth 3 (2021)
Knight Trilogy
Ivanhoe (1952)
Knights of the Round Table (1953)
The Adventures of Quentin Durward (1955)
 Knight Rider **
 Knight Rider 2000 (1991) (TV)
 Knight Rider 2010 (1994) (TV)
 Knight Rider (2008) (TV)
The Koker Trilogy
 Where Is the Friend's Home? (1987)
 And Life Goes On (aka Life and Nothing More) (1992)
 Through the Olive Trees (1994)
Kolpaçino
Kolpaçino (2009)
Kolpaçino: Bomba (2011)
 (2016)
Kotigobba
Kotigobba (2001)
Kotigobba 2 (2016)
Kotigobba 3 (2019)
Koi... Mil Gaya/Krrish
Koi... Mil Gaya (2003)
Krrish (2006)
Krrish 3 (2013)
Kung Fu **
 Kung Fu: The Way of the Tiger, the Sign of the Dragon (1972) (TV)
 Kung Fu: The Movie (1986) (TV)
 Kung Fu: The Next Generation (1987) (TV)
Kung Fu Panda * (A)
Kung Fu Panda (2008)
Kung Fu Panda 2 (2011)
Kung Fu Panda 3 (2016)
Kutsal Damacana
 Kutsal Damacana (2007)
 Kutsal Damacana 2: İtmen (2010)
 Kutsal Damacana: Dracoola (2011)
Kyaa Kool Hai Hum
Kyaa Kool Hai Hum (2005)
Kyaa Super Kool Hain Hum (2012)
Kyaa Kool Hain Hum 3 (2016)

L

Lanester (2013) (TV)
Lanester: Memento Mori (2016) (TV)
Lanester: The Children of the Last Rain (2017) (TV)
Lapland Odyssey
Lapland Odyssey (2010)
 (2015)
 (2017)
The Last Chance Detectives
The Last Chance Detectives: Mystery Lights of Navajo Mesa (1994) (TV)
The Last Chance Detectives: Legend of the Desert Bigfoot (1995) (TV)
The Last Chance Detectives: Escape from Fire Lake (1996) (TV)
Left Behind
Left Behind (2000) (V)
Left Behind II: Tribulation Force (2002) (V)
Left Behind: World at War (2005)
Les Tuche
Les Tuche (2011)
Les Tuche 2 (2016)
Les Tuche 3 (2018)
The Librarian *
 The Librarian: Quest for the Spear (2004) (TV)
 The Librarian: Return to King Solomon's Mines (2006) (TV)
 The Librarian: Curse of the Judas Chalice (2008) (TV)
Lilly the Witch
 Lilly the Witch: The Dragon and the Magic Book (2009)
 Lilly the Witch: The Journey to Mandolan (2011)
 (2017)
L'insegnante
L'insegnante (1975)
L'insegnante va in collegio (1978)
L'insegnante viene a casa (1978)
Disney's The Little Mermaid * (A)
The Little Mermaid (1989)
The Little Mermaid II: Return to the Sea (2000)
The Little Mermaid: Ariel's Beginning (2008)

Look Who's Talking
Look Who's Talking (1989)
Look Who's Talking Too (1990)
Look Who's Talking Now (1993)
The Lost Boys
The Lost Boys (1987)
Lost Boys: The Tribe (2008) (V)
Lost Boys: The Thirst (2010) (V)
The Lord of the Rings
The Lord of the Rings: The Fellowship of the Ring (2001)
The Lord of the Rings: The Two Towers (2002) 
The Lord of the Rings: The Return of the King (2003) 
The Lost Treasure of the Knights Templar
The Lost Treasure of the Knights Templar (2006)
The Lost Treasure of the Knights Templar II (2007)
The Lost Treasure of the Knights Templar III: The Mystery of the Snake Crown (2008)
Love Hunter
Love Hunter (1972)
Love Hunter: Hot Skin (1972)
Love Hunter: Lust (1973)
Lucky Stars (Primary Trilogy)
 Winners and Sinners (1983)
 My Lucky Stars (1985)
 Twinkle, Twinkle Lucky Stars (1986)
Lucky Stars (Secondary Trilogy)
 Lucky Stars Go Places (1986)
 Return of the Lucky Stars (1989)
 Ghost Punting (1991)
Lyubit po-russki
Lyubit po-russki (1989)
Lyubit po-russki 2 (1996)
Lyubit po-russki 3: Gubernator (1999)

M

Major League
 Major League (1989)
 Major League II (1994)
 Major League: Back to the Minors (1998) 
Malevolence
 Malevolence (2003)
 Bereavement (2010) (prequel)
 Killer: Malevolence 3 (2018)
A Man and a Woman
A Man and a Woman (1966)
A Man and a Woman: 20 Years Later (1986)
Les plus belles années d'une vie (2019)
A Man Called Horse
 A Man Called Horse (1970)
 The Return of a Man Called Horse (1976)
 Triumphs of a Man Called Horse (1982)
The Mangler
 The Mangler (1995)
 The Mangler 2 (2002) (V)
 The Mangler Reborn (2005) (V)
 Maniac Cop
 Maniac Cop (1988)
 Maniac Cop 2 (1990) (V)
 Maniac Cop III: Badge of Silence (1993) (V)
Mark Trilogy
Mark of the Cop (1975)
Mark Shoots First (1975)
Mark Strikes Again (1976)
Marrying the Mafia
Marrying the Mafia (2002)
Marrying the Mafia II (2005)
Marrying the Mafia III (2006)
The Mary Tyler Moore Show *
 Mary Tyler Moore: The 20th Anniversary Show (1991) (TV)
 Mary and Rhoda (2000) (TV)
 The Mary Tyler Moore Reunion (2002) (TV)
The Masked Gang
 The Masked Gang (2005)
 The Masked Gang: Iraq (2007)
 The Masked Gang: Cyprus (2008)
Max the Angel
A Town Without Christmas (2001) (TV)
Finding John Christmas (2003) (TV)
When Angels Come to Town (2004) (TV)
 The Maxim Trilogy
 The Youth of Maxim (1935)
 The Return of Maxim (1937)
 The Vyborg Side (1939)
Maze Runner
The Maze Runner (2014)
Maze Runner: The Scorch Trials (2015)
Maze Runner: The Death Cure (2018)
Meet the Parents
Meet the Parents (2000)
Meet the Fockers (2004)
Little Fockers (2010)
 Mercenary Trilogy
The Mercenary (1968)
Compañeros (1970)
Long Live Your Death (1971)
 Mexico Trilogy
 El Mariachi (1992)
 Desperado (1995)
 Once Upon a Time In Mexico (2003)
Michael Haneke's Glaciation Trilogy
The Seventh Continent (1989)
Benny's Video (1992)
71 Fragments of a Chronology of Chance (1994)
 Mick Travis trilogy
 If.... (1968)
 O Lucky Man! (1973)
 Britannia Hospital (1982)
 The Mighty Ducks **
 The Mighty Ducks (1992)
 D2: The Mighty Ducks (1994)
 D3: The Mighty Ducks (1996)
Mike Graham (Alistair MacLean's UNACO)
The Hostage Tower (1980) (TV)
Death Train (aka Detonator) (1993) (TV)
Night Watch (1995) (TV)
Millennium film series
 The Girl With The Dragon Tattoo (2009)
 The Girl Who Played With Fire (2009)
 The Girl Who Kicked The Hornets' Nest (2009)
Mimic
 Mimic (1997)
 Mimic 2 (2001) (V)
 Mimic 3: Sentinel (2003) (V)
 The Miracle Worker
 The Miracle Worker (1962 film)
 The Miracle Worker (1979 film)
 The Miracle Worker (2000 film)
Missing in Action
 Missing in Action (1984)
 Missing in Action 2: The Beginning (1985) (prequel)
 Braddock: Missing in Action III (1988)
Mobile Suit Gundam
 Mobile Suit Gundam (1981)
 Mobile Suit Gundam II: Soldiers of Sorrow (1981)
 Mobile Suit Gundam III: Encounters in Space (1982)
Mobile Suit Zeta Gundam: A New Translation
 Mobile Suit Zeta Gundam: A New Translation - Heir to the Stars (2004)
 Mobile Suit Zeta Gundam II: A New Translation - Lovers (2005)
 Mobile Suit Zeta Gundam III: A New Translation - Love is the Pulse of the Stars (2006)
The Mouse and the Motorcycle
 The Mouse and the Motorcycle (1986) (TV)
 Runaway Ralph (1988) (TV)
 Ralph S. Mouse (1990) (TV)
A Moment of Romance
A Moment of Romance (1990)
A Moment of Romance II (1992)
A Moment of Romance III (1996)
Money
Money (1993)
Money Money (1995)
Money Money, More Money (2011)
The Monkey King
The Monkey King (2014)
The Monkey King 2 (2016)
The Monkey King 3 (2018)
Mostly Ghostly
Mostly Ghostly (2008) (V)
Mostly Ghostly: Have You Met My Ghoulfriend? (2014) (V)
Mostly Ghostly: One Night in Doom House (2016) (V)
 Mr. Belvedere *
 Sitting Pretty (1948)
 Mr. Belvedere Goes to College (1949)
 Mr. Belvedere Rings the Bell (1951)
 Mr. Bones
 Mr. Bones  (2001)
 Mr. Bones: Back From The Past (2008)
 Mr. Bones: Son of Bones (2022)
 Mr. District Attorney 
 Mr. District Attorney (1941)
 Mr. District Attorney in the Carter Case (1941)
 Secrets of the Underground (1942)
Murder
 Murder (2004)
 Murder 2 (2011)
 Murder 3 (2013)
MVP
 MVP: Most Valuable Primate (2000)
 MVP 2: Most Vertical Primate (2001)
 MXP: Most Xtreme Primate (2003)
My Friend Flicka *
 My Friend Flicka (1943)
 Thunderhead, Son of Flicka (1945)
 Green Grass of Wyoming (1948)
My Friends Tigger & Pooh *
Super Sleuth Christmas Movie (2007) (V)
Tigger & Pooh and a Musical Too (2009) (V)
My Friends Tigger & Pooh: Super Duper Super Sleuths (2010) (V)
My Super Psycho Sweet 16
 My Super Psycho Sweet 16 (2009) (TV)
 My Super Psycho Sweet 16: Part 2 (2010) (TV)
 My Super Psycho Sweet 16: Part 3 (2012) (TV)
Mortal Kombat (A) 
Mortal Kombat Legends: Scorpion's Revenge (2020) (V)
Mortal Kombat Legends: Battle of the Realms (2021) (V)
Mortal Kombat Legends: Snow Blind (2022) (V)
My Wife Is a Gangster
My Wife Is a Gangster (2001)
My Wife Is a Gangster 2 (2003)
My Wife Is a Gangster 3 (2006)

N

 The Naked Gun *
 The Naked Gun: From the Files of Police Squad! (1988)
 The Naked Gun 2½: The Smell of Fear (1991)
 Naked Gun : The Final Insult (1994)
Napló gyermekeimnek
Napló gyermekeimnek (1984)
Napló szerelmeimnek (1987)
Napló apámnak, anyá
Naruto (Original series)
Naruto the Movie: Ninja Clash in the Land of Snow (2004)
Naruto the Movie 2: Legend of the Stone of Gelel (2005)
Naruto the Movie 3: Guardians of the Crescent Moon Kingdom (2006)
National Lampoon's Dorm Daze
 National Lampoon Presents Dorm Daze (2002)
 National Lampoon's Dorm Daze 2 (2006) (V) 
 Transylmania (2009)
Nemuri Kyoshirō (Kōji Tsuruta series)
 Nemuri Kyôshirô Burai Hikae (1956)
 Nemuri Kyôshirô Burai Hikae Dainibu (1957)
 Nemuri Kyôshirô Burai Hikae: Maken Jigoku (1958)
Never Back Down
 Never Back Down (2008)
 Never Back Down 2: The Beatdown (2011)
 Never Back Down: No Surrender (2016) (V)
The NeverEnding Story **
 The NeverEnding Story (1984)
 The NeverEnding Story II: The Next Chapter (1990)
 The NeverEnding Story III: Escape from Fantasia (1994)
New Initial D the Movie
New Initial D the Movie: Legend 1 - Awakening (2014)
New Initial D the Movie: Legend 2 - Racer (2015)
New Initial D the Movie: Legend 3 - Dream (2016)
New Mr. Vampire
New Mr. Vampire (1987)
New Mr. Vampire 2 (1990)
New Mr. Vampire 3 (1991)
Nick Carter (1939 series)
Nick Carter, Master Detective (1939)
Phantom Raiders (1940)
Sky Murder (1940)
 Night of the Demons
 Night of the Demons (1988)
 Night of the Demons 2 (1994) (V)
 Night of the Demons III (1997) (V)
 Nikka Zaildar
 Nikka Zaildar (2016)
 Nikka Zaildar 2 (2017)
 Nikka Zaildar 3 (2019)
 Ninja Missions
 The Ninja Mission (1984)
 Eagle Island (1986)
 Russian Terminator (1989)
 The Ninja Trilogy
 Enter the Ninja (1981)
 Revenge of the Ninja (1983)
 Ninja III: The Domination (1984)
 No Retreat, No Surrender
 No Retreat, No Surrender (1986)
 No Retreat, No Surrender 2 (1989) (V)
 No Retreat, No Surrender 3: Blood Brothers (1992) (V)
 Noriko
 Late Spring (1949)
 Early Summer (1951)
 Tokyo Story (1953)
Not Stupid
 I Not Stupid (2002)*
 I Not Stupid Too (2006)*
 We Not Naughty (2012)
 Not Quite Human
 Not Quite Human (1987) (TV)
 Not Quite Human II (1989) (TV)
 Still Not Quite Human (1992) (TV)
 The Note
 The Note (2007) (TV)
 Taking a Chance on Love (2009) (TV)
 Notes from the Heart Healer (2012) (TV)
 Numbskull
 O Brother, Where Art Thou? (2000)
 Intolerable Cruelty (2003)
 Hail, Caesar! (2016)
 Nunsense
 Nunsense (1993) (TV)
 Nunsense 2: The Sequel (1994) (TV)
 Nunsense Jamboree (1998) (TV)

O

 Oh, God!
 Oh, God! (1977)
 Oh, God! Book II (1980)
 Oh, God! You Devil (1984)
 On the Buses *
 On the Buses (1971)
 Mutiny on the Buses (1971)
 Holiday on the Buses (1972)
 Once Upon a Time Trilogy
 Once Upon a Time in the West (1968)
 Once Upon a Time...A Fistful of Dynomite (1971)
 Once Upon a Time in America (1984)
 One Missed Call *
 One Missed Call (2004)
 One Missed Call 2 (2005)
 One Missed Call: Final (2006)
Ong-Bak
Ong-Bak: Muay Thai Warrior (2003)
Ong Bak 2 (2008) (prequel)
Ong Bak 3 (2010) (prequel)
Outpost
Outpost (2008)
Outpost: Black Sun (2012) 
Outpost: Rise of the Spetsnaz (2013) (prequel)
Open Water
Open Water (2003)
Open Water 2: Adrift (2006)
Open Water 3: Cage Dive (2017)
Optimistic Trilogy (aka Roman Trilogy)
Poveri ma belli (1957)
Pretty But Poor (1957)
Poor Millionaires (1959)
Orgasmo
 Orgasmo (1969)
 Così dolce... così perversa (1969)
 Paranoia (1970)
The Orphic Trilogy
The Blood of a Poet (1932)
Orphée (1950)
Testament of Orpheus (1960)
Our Crazy Aunts 
Unsere tollen Tanten in der Südsee (1961)
Our Crazy Nieces (1963)
Our Crazy Aunts in the South Seas (1964)
Outrage
Outrage (2010)
Beyond Outrage (2012)
Outrage Coda (2017)

P

På dessa skuldror
 (1948)
 (1949)
Tarps Elin (1956)
Alejandro González Iñárritu & Guillermo Arriaga's Pain Trilogy
Amores perros (2000)
21 Grams (2003)
Babel (2006)
 Page 3
 Page 3 (2005)
 Corporate (2006)
 Traffic Signal (2007)
Palaris
Palaris (1941)
Awit ni palaris (1946)
Anak ni palaris (1955)
Partners in Crime
Mon petit doigt m'a dit... (2005)
Crime Is Our Business (2008)
 (2012)
 Patlabor * (A)
 Patlabor: The Movie (2001)
 Patlabor 2: The Movie (2002)
 WXIII: Patlabor the Movie 3 (2003)
 Pelle og Proffen
 Døden på Oslo S (1990)
  (1992)
 De blå ulvene (1993)
 Penitentiary
 Penitentiary (1979)
 Penitentiary II (1982)
 Penitentiary III (1987)
Pepe el Toro *
Nosotros los Pobres (1948)
Ustedes los ricos (1948)
Pepe el Toro (1953)
Per
 (1973)
Per (1975)
 (1976)
Peter Voss
Peter Voss, Thief of Millions (1958)
 (1959)
Peter Voss, Hero of the Day (1959)
Phoenix *
Phoenix (1978)
Phoenix 2772 (1980)
Phoenix: Ho-o (1986)
Pido Dida
Pido Dida: Sabay Tayo (1990)
Pido Dida 2 (Kasal na) (1991)
Pido Dida 3: May kambal na (1992)
Piédalu
 (1951)
 (1952)
 (1954)
Pier Paolo Pasolini's Trilogy of Life
Il Decameron (1971)
I racconti di Canterbury (1972)
Il fiore delle mille e una notte (1974)
Piger i trøjen
Piger i trøjen (1975)
Piger i trøjen 2 (1976)
Piger til søs (1977)
Pink Tush Girl
Pink Tush Girl (1978)
Pink Tush Girl: Love Attack (1979)
Pink Tush Girl: Proposal Strategy (1980)
Pitch Perfect *
Pitch Perfect (2012)
Pitch Perfect 2 (2015)
Pitch Perfect 3 (2017)
Poeten og Lillemor
Poeten og Lillemor (1959)
Poeten og Lillemor og Lotte (1960)
Poeten og Lillemor i forårshumør (1961)
 Poltergeist
 Poltergeist (1982)
 Poltergeist II: The Other Side (1986)
 Poltergeist III (1988)
 Political Trilogy
 Roja (1992)
 Bombay (1995)
 Dil Se.. (1998)
Popeye ***** (a)
Popeye Meets the Man Who Hated Laughter (1972) (TV)
Popeye (1980)
Popeye's Voyage: The Quest for Pappy (2004) (V)
 Porky's
 Porky's (1982)
 Porky's II: The Next Day (1983)
 Porky's Revenge (1985)
 Prehysteria!
 Prehysteria! (1993)
 Prehysteria! 2 (1994) (V)
 Prehysteria! 3 (1995) (V)
 Private Gladiator
 Private Gladiator (2001)
 Private Gladiator: In the City of Lust (2001)
 Private Gladiator: Sexual Conquest (2001)
 Private Lessons
 Private Lessons (1981)
 Private Lessons II (1993)
 Private Lessons: Another Story (1994)
Problem Child
Problem Child (1990)
Problem Child 2 (1991)
Problem Child 3: Junior in Love (1995) (TV)
Proud to be a Sikh
Proud to be a Sikh (2014)
Proud to be a Sikh 2 (2017)
Proud to be a Sikh 3 (2019)
Psych *
Psych: The Movie (2017)
Psych 2: Lassie Come Home (2019)
Psych 3: This Is Gus (2021)
Pulse
Pulse (2006)
Pulse 2: Afterlife (2008) (V)
Pulse 3 (2008) (V)
Pure Country
Pure Country (1992)
Pure Country 2: The Gift (2010)
Pure Country: Pure Heart (2017)
Pusher
Pusher (1996)
Pusher II: With Blood on my Hands (2004)
Pusher III: I'm the Angel of Death (2005)
Puella Magi Madoka Magica: The Movie (A)
Puella Magi Madoka Magica Part 1: Beginnings (2012)
Puella Magi Madoka Magica Part 2: Eternal (2012)
Puella Magi Madoka Magica New Story: Rebellion (2013)
The Punisher
The Punisher (1989)
The Punisher (2004)
Punisher: War Zone (2008)
Puss in Boots (A)
Puss in Boots (1969)
The Three Musketeers in Boots (1972)
Puss in Boots Travels Around the World (1976)

Q

 Quatermass
 The Quatermass Xperiment (1955)
 Quatermass 2 (1957)
 Quatermass and the Pit (1967)

R

Race
Race (2008)
Race 2 (2013)
Race 3 (2018)
 The Rat
 The Rat (1925)
 The Triumph of the Rat (1926)
 The Return of the Rat (1929)
 Re-Animator
 Re-Animator (1985)
 Bride of Re-Animator (1991)
 Beyond Re-Animator (2003) (TV)
 The Red Curtain Trilogy
 Strictly Ballroom (1992)
 William Shakespeare's Romeo + Juliet (1997)
 Moulin Rouge! (2001)
 Red Riding Trilogy
 Red Riding: In the Year of Our Lord 1974 (2009)
 Red Riding: In the Year of Our Lord 1980 (2009)
 Red Riding: In the Year of Our Lord 1983 (2009)
 Restless
 Restless (2000)
 Me and Morrison (2001)
 Addiction (2004)
The Ring (American series)
The Ring (2002)
The Ring Two (2005)
Rings (2017)
Ring of Fire
Ring of Fire (1991)
Ring of Fire II: Blood and Steel (1993)
Ring of Fire 3: Lion Strike (1995)
 Road Movie Trilogy
 Alice in the Cities (1974)
 The Wrong Move (1975)
 Kings of the Road (1976)
Roadkill
Roadkill (1989)
Highway 61 (1991)
Hard Core Logo (1996)
Robert Langdon film series *
The Da Vinci Code (2006)
Angels & Demons (2009)
Inferno (2016)
Robin Hood (Columbia Pictures)
The Bandit of Sherwood Forest (1946)
The Prince of Thieves (1948)
Rogues of Sherwood Forest (1950)
Robin Hood (Hammer Films) *
The Men of Sherwood Forest (1954)
Sword of Sherwood Forest (1960)
A Challenge for Robin Hood (1967)
 RoboCop ***
 RoboCop (1987)
 RoboCop 2 (1990)
 RoboCop 3 (1993)
 Rock 'n' Roll High School
 Rock 'n' Roll High School (1979)
 Rock 'n' Roll High School Forever (1991)
 Shake, Rattle and Rock! (1994) (TV)
The Rocky and Bullwinkle Show * (a)
Boris and Natasha: The Movie (1992)
Dudley Do-Right (1999)
The Adventures of Rocky and Bullwinkle (2000)
Rogue Warfare
Rogue Warfare (2019)
Rogue Warfare 2: The Hunt (2019)
Rogue Warfare 3: Death of a Nation (2019)
The Roller Blade Seven
The Roller Blade Seven (1991)
The Legend of the Roller Blade Seven (1992)
Return of the Roller Blade Seven (1993)
 Rugrats * (A) (Theatrical films)
 The Rugrats Movie (1998)
 Rugrats in Paris: The Movie (2000)
 Rugrats Go Wild (2003)
 Rush Hour
 Rush Hour (1998)
 Rush Hour 2 (2001)
 Rush Hour 3 (2007)

S

Sabrina the Teenage Witch *
 Sabrina the Teenage Witch (1996) (TV)
 Sabrina Goes to Rome (1998) (TV)
 Sabrina Down Under (1999) (TV)
Samurai Trilogy (Hiroshi Inagaki)
 Samurai I: Musashi Miyamoto (1954)
 Samurai II: Duel at Ichijoji Temple (1955)
 Samurai III: Duel at Ganryu Island (1956) 
Samurai Trilogy (Yoji Yamada)
 The Twilight Samurai (2002)
 The Hidden Blade (2004)
 Love and Honor (2006)
The Sandlot
 The Sandlot (1993)
 The Sandlot 2 (2005) (V)
 The Sandlot: Heading Home (2007) (V)
The Santa Clause *
 The Santa Clause (1994)
 The Santa Clause 2 (2002)
 The Santa Clause 3: The Escape Clause (2006)
Nurse Sarah Keate
 While the Patient Slept (1935)
 The Patient in Room 18 (1938)
 Mystery House (1938)
Sarah, Plain and Tall
 Sarah, Plain and Tall (1991) (TV)
 Skylark (1993) (TV)
 Sarah, Plain and Tall: Winter's End (1999) (TV)
Scarecrow
 Scarecrow (2002) (V)
 Scarecrow Slayer (2003) (V)
 Scarecrow Gone Wild (2004) (V)
Screwballs
 Screwballs (1983)
 Screwballs II: Loose Screws (1985)
 Screwball Hotel (1988)
Secret Agent 077
 Agent 077: Mission Bloody Mary (1965)
 Agent 077: From the Orient with Fury (1965)
 Special Mission Lady Chaplin (1966)
Secret Games
 Secret Games (1992)
 Secret Games 2: The Escort (1993)
 Secret Games 3 (1994)
The Sentimental Swordsman
 The Sentimental Swordsman (1977)
 Return of the Sentimental Swordsman (1981)
 Perils of the Sentimental Swordsman (1982)
Sinbad the Sailor (Schneer-Harryhausen film series)
 The 7th Voyage of Sinbad (1958)
 The Golden Voyage of Sinbad (1974)
 Sinbad and the Eye of the Tiger (1977)
Sex and Zen
 Sex and Zen (1992)
 Sex and Zen II (1996)
 Sex and Zen III (1998)
Shaolin Temple
 Shaolin Temple (1982)
 Kids From Shaolin (1983)
 Martial Arts of Shaolin (1986)
Shark Attack
 Shark Attack (1999) (TV)
 Shark Attack 2 (2001) (V)
 Shark Attack 3: Megalodon (2002) (V)
Sharktopus
 Sharktopus (2010) (TV)
 Sharktopus vs. Pteracuda (2014) (TV)
 Sharktopus vs. Whalewolf (2015) (TV)
 Sherlock Holmes: The Golden Years
 Sherlock Holmes and the Deadly Necklace (1962)
 Sherlock Holmes and the Leading Lady (1991)
 Sherlock Holmes and the Incident at Victoria Falls (1992)
Shiloh
 Shiloh (1996)
 Shiloh 2: Shiloh Season (1999)
 Saving Shiloh (2006)
Silence of God (aka Trilogy of Faith or Bergman's Faith Trilogy)
 Through a Glass Darkly (1961)
 Winter Light (1963)
 The Silence (1963)
Silent Night, Bloody Night
 Silent Night, Bloody Night (1972)
 Silent Night, Bloody Night 2: Revival (2014)
 Silent Night, Bloody Night: The Homecoming (2013)
Sissi
Sissi (1955)
Sissi – The Young Empress (1956)
Sissi – Fateful Years of an Empress (1957)
Sister Street Fighter
Sister Street Fighter (1974)
Sister Street Fighter: Hanging by a Thread (1974)
The Return of the Sister Street Fighter (1975)
The Skulls
The Skulls (2000)
The Skulls II (2002) (V)
The Skulls III (2004) (V)
Skyline
Skyline (2010)
Beyond Skyline (2017)
Skylines (2020)
Slap Shot
Slap Shot (1977)
Slap Shot 2: Breaking the Ice (2002) (V)
Slap Shot 3: The Junior League (2008) (V)
Slumber Party Massacre
The Slumber Party Massacre (1982)
Slumber Party Massacre II (1987)
Slumber Party Massacre III (1990)
Snake Eater
Snake Eater (1989)
Snake Eater II: The Drug Buster (1991)
Snake Eater III: His Law (1992)
Sometimes They Come Back
 Sometimes They Come Back (1991) (TV)
 Sometimes They Come Back... Again (1996) (V)
 Sometimes They Come Back... for More (1998) (V)
 Sophie Lang
 The Notorious Sophie Lang (1934)
 The Return of Sophie Lang (1936)
 Sophie Lang Goes West (1937)
Sorority House Massacre
 Sorority House Massacre (1986)
 Sorority House Massacre II (1990)
 Sorority House Massacre III: Hard to Die (1990)
The Spessart Trilogy
 The Spessart Inn (1958)
 The Haunted Castle (1960)
 Glorious Times at the Spessart Inn (1967)
Spider-Man (Sam Raimi film series) *
 Spider-Man (2002)
 Spider-Man 2 (2004)
 Spider-Man 3 (2007)
Spider-Man — The Spider-Verse Saga (A)
 Spider-Man: Into the Spider-Verse (2018)
 Spider-Man: Across the Spider-Verse (2023)
 Spider-Man: Beyond the Spider-Verse (2024)
SpongeBob SquarePants * (a)
 The SpongeBob SquarePants Movie (2004)
 The SpongeBob Movie: Sponge Out of Water (2015)
 The SpongeBob Movie: Sponge on the Run (2020)
Star Wars: Original trilogy *
 Star Wars: Episode IV - A New Hope (1977)
 Star Wars: Episode V - The Empire Strikes Back (1980)
 Star Wars: Episode VI - Return of the Jedi (1983)
Star Wars: Prequel trilogy **
 Star Wars: Episode I – The Phantom Menace (1999)
 Star Wars: Episode II – Attack of the Clones (2002)
 Star Wars: Episode III – Revenge of the Sith (2005)
Star Wars: Sequel trilogy *
 Star Wars: Episode VII - The Force Awakens (2015)
 Star Wars: Episode VIII - The Last Jedi (2017)
 Star Wars: Episode IX - The Rise of Skywalker (2019)
Stargate **
 Stargate (1994)
 Stargate: The Ark of Truth (2008) (V)
 Stargate: Continuum (2008) (V)
Starzan
 Starzan: Shouting Star of the Jungle (1989)
 Starzan II: The Coming of the Star Son (1989)
 Starzan III: The Jungle Triangle (1990)
The Street Fighter
 The Street Fighter (1974)
 Return of the Street Fighter (1974)
 The Street Fighter's Last Revenge (1974)
Stuart Little * (a)
 Stuart Little (1999)
 Stuart Little 2 (2002)
 Stuart Little 3: Call of the Wild (2005) (V)
Sony's Spider-Man Universe
 Venom (2018)
 Venom: Let There Be Carnage (2021)
 Morbius (2022)
S.W.A.T. *
 S.W.A.T. (2003)
 S.W.A.T.: Firefight (2011) (V)
 S.W.A.T.: Under Siege (2017) (V)
The Swordsman
 The Swordsman (1990)
 Swordsman II (1992)
 The East Is Red (1994) (aka Swordsman III)

T

Tad, the Lost Explorer (A)
 Tad, The Lost Explorer (2013)
 Tad the Lost Explorer and the Secret of King Midas (2017)
 Tad the Lost Explorer and the Curse of the Mummy (2022)
Taken
Taken (2008)
Taken 2 (2012)
Taken 3 (2014)
 Tales from the Crypt *
 Demon Knight (1995)
 Bordello of Blood (1996)
 Ritual (2002) (V)
 Disney's Tarzan * (A)
 Tarzan (1999)
 Tarzan & Jane (2002) (V)
 Tarzan II (2005) (V) (prequel)
The Ten Gladiators
 The Ten Gladiators (1963)
 Triumph of the Ten Gladiators (1964)
 Spartacus and the Ten Gladiators (1964)
Tetsuo
Tetsuo: The Iron Man (1989)
Tetsuo II: Body Hammer (1992)
Tetsuo: The Bullet Man (2010)
 That's Entertainment! *
 That's Entertainment! (1974)
 That's Entertainment, Part II (1975)
 That's Entertainment! III (1996)
Things
Things (1993)
Things II (1998)
Things 3: Old Things (1998) (V)
The 36th Chamber Of Shaolin (aka The Master Killer Series)
The 36th Chamber Of Shaolin (1978)
Return to the 36th Chamber (1980)
Disciples Of The 36th Chamber (1985)
 Three Colors
 Three Colors: Blue (1993)
 Three Colors: White (1994)
 Three Colors: Red (1994)
 Three Flavours Cornetto
 Shaun of the Dead (2004)
 Hot Fuzz (2007)
 The World's End (2013)
 The Three Mothers
 Suspiria (1977)
 Inferno (1980)
 The Mother of Tears (2007)
 Three Smart Girls
 Three Smart Girls (1936)
 Three Smart Girls Grow Up (1939)
 Hers to Hold (1941)
 Thunder in Paradise *
 Thunder in Paradise (1993) (V)
 Thunder in Paradise II (1994) (V)
 Thunder in Paradise 3 (1995) (V)
Thunder Warrior
Thunder Warrior (1983)
Thunder Warrior II (1987)
Thunder Warrior III (1988)
 Thunderbirds (1980 series) *
 Thunderbirds to the Rescue (1980) (TV)
 Thunderbirds in Outer Space (1981) (TV)
 Countdown to Disaster (1981) (TV)
Tiger Cage
Tiger Cage (1988)
Tiger Cage 2 (1990)
Tiger Cage 3 (1991)
Tiger Claws
Tiger Claws (1992)
Tiger Claws II (1996)
Tiger Claws III (1999)
Tillie Banks-Tinklepaw
Tillie's Punctured Romance (1914)
Tillie's Tomato Surprise (1915)
Tillie Wakes Up (1917)
The Time Trilogy
San (1966)
Jutro (1967)
Podne (1968)
To All the Boys
To All the Boys I've Loved Before (2018)
To All the Boys: P.S. I Still Love You (2020)
To All the Boys: Always and Forever, Lara Jean (2020)
 Tom Ripley
 The Talented Mr. Ripley (1999)
 Ripley's Game (2002)
 Ripley Under Ground (2005)
Topper *
Topper (1937)
Topper Takes a Trip (1938)
Topper Returns (1941)
The Transylvanians
The Prophet, the Gold and the Transylvanians (1978)
The Actress, the Dollars and the Transylvanians (1979)
The Oil, the Baby and the Transylvanians (1981)
Trailer Park Boys *
Trailer Park Boys: The Movie (2006)
Trailer Park Boys: Countdown to Liquor Day (2009)
Trailer Park Boys: Don't Legalize It (2014)
 Trilogy of Americana (Terry Gilliam)
 The Fisher King (1991)
 12 Monkeys (1995)
 Fear and Loathing in Las Vegas (1998)
 Trilogy of Imagination (Terry Gilliam)
 Time Bandits (1981)
 Brazil (1985)
 The Adventures of Baron Munchausen (1988)
Trinity
They Call Me Trinity (1970)
Trinity Is Still My Name (1971)
Sons of Trinity (1995)
 Troll
 Troll (1986)
 Troll 2 (1990) (aka Goblins)
 Troll 3 (1990) (aka Ator III: The Hobgoblin)
 Tugboat Annie
 Tugboat Annie (1933)
 Tugboat Annie Sails Again (1940)
 Captain Tugboat Annie (1945)
Turbulence
Turbulence (1997)
Turbulence 2: Fear of Flying (1999) (V)
Turbulence 3: Heavy Metal (2001) (V)
A Turtle's Tale (A) *
A Turtle's Tale: Sammy's Adventures (2010)
A Turtle's Tale 2: Sammy's Escape from Paradise (2012)
Sammy & Co: Turtle Paradise (2017)

U

 Ultraman Tiga
 Ultraman Tiga & Ultraman Dyna: Warriors of the Star of Light (1998)
 Ultraman Tiga & Ultraman Dyna & Ultraman Gaia: Battle in Hyperspace (1999)
 Ultraman Tiga: The Final Odyssey (2000)
The Untouchables (1959-1989 series) *
The Scarface Mob (1959) (TV)
The Revenge of Al Capone (1989) (TV)
The Return of Eliot Ness (1991) (TV)
 Up Pompeii! *
 Up Pompeii (1971)
 Up the Chastity Belt (1971)
 Up the Front (1972)
Uptown Saturday Night
Uptown Saturday Night (1974)
Let's Do It Again (1975)
A Piece of the Action (1977)
 Urban Legend
 Urban Legend (1998)
 Urban Legends: Final Cut (2000)
 Urban Legends: Bloody Mary (2005) (V)
 USA - Land of Opportunities
 Dogville (2003)
 Manderlay (2005)
 Washington (2009)
 U.S. Seals
 U.S. Seals (2000) (V)
 U.S. Seals II: The Ultimate Force (2001) (V)
 U.S. Seals 3: Frogmen (2002) (V)

V

 Vampires
 Vampires (1998)
 Vampires: Los Muertos (2002) (V)
 Vampires: The Turning (2005) (V)
 Van Wilder
 Van Wilder (2002)
 Van Wilder: The Rise of Taj (2006)
 Van Wilder: Freshman Year (2009) (V) (prequel)
 The Vengeance Trilogy
 Sympathy for Mr. Vengeance (2002)
 Oldboy (2003)
 Sympathy for Lady Vengeance (2005)
Vietnam War
Platoon (1986)
Born on the Fourth of July (1989)
Heaven & Earth (1993)
The Vineyard
Autumn in the Vineyard (2016) (TV)
Summer in the Vineyard (2017) (TV)
Valentine in the Vineyard (2019) (TV)
The Visitors
The Visitors (1993)
The Visitors II: The Corridors of Time (1998)
The Visitors: Bastille Day (2016)
The Vizconde Massacre Story (God Help Us!)
The Vizconde Massacre Story (God Help Us!) (1993)
The Untold Story: Vizconde Massacre II - May the Lord Be with Us (1994)
Jessica Alfaro Story (1995)

W

 Walking Tall (Original series)
 Walking Tall (1973)
 Walking Tall Part 2 (1975)
 Walking Tall: Final Chapter (1977)

 Walking Tall (2004 series)
 Walking Tall (2004)
 Walking Tall: The Payback (2007) (V)
 Walking Tall: Lone Justice (2007) (V)
Wally "The Fox" Benton
Whistling in the Dark (1941)
Whistling in Dixie (1942)
Whistling in Brooklyn (1943)
Warlock
Warlock (1989)
Warlock: The Armageddon (1993)
Warlock III: The End of Innocence (1999) (V)
The Weight of Chains
The Weight of Chains (2011)
The Weight of Chains 2 (2014)
The Weight of Chains 3 (2019)
White Collar Hooligan
The Rise and Fall of a White Collar Hooligan (2012) (V)
The Rise and Fall of a White Collar Hooligan 2: England Away (2013) (V)
White Collar Hooligan 3 (2014) (V)
 The Wild Thornberrys *
 The Wild Thornberrys: The Origin of Donnie (2001) (TV)
 The Wild Thornberrys Movie (2002)
 Rugrats Go Wild! (2003)
The Wilderness Family
The Adventures of the Wilderness Family (1975)
The Further Adventures of the Wilderness Family (1978)
Mountain Family Robinson (1979)
 Witchboard
 Witchboard (1986)
 Witchboard 2: The Devil's Doorway (1993)
 Witchboard III: The Possession (1995)
 Witchouse
 Witchouse (1999) (V)
 Witchouse 2: Blood Coven (1999) (V)
 Witchouse 3: Demon Fire (2001) (V)
The Wizard of Oz (1914 series)
The Patchwork Girl of Oz (1914)
The Magic Cloak (1914)
His Majesty, the Scarecrow of Oz (1914)
The Wizard of Oz (1939 series)
The Wizard of Oz (1939)
Return to Oz (1985)
Oz the Great and Powerful (2013) (prequel)
 The Work and the Glory
 The Work and the Glory: Pillar of Light (2004)
 The Work and the Glory II: American Zion (2005)
 The Work and the Glory III: A House Divided (2006)

X

 Xtro
 Xtro (1983)
 Xtro II: The Second Encounter (1990)
 Xtro 3: Watch the Skies (1993)
xXx
xXx (2002)
xXx: State of the Union (2005)
xXx: Return of Xander Cage (2017)

Y

You Got Served
You Got Served (2004)
You Got Served: Beat the World (2011)
You Got Served 2 (2019)

Z

 Zack Snyder's Justice League Trilogy
 Man of Steel (2013)
 Batman v Superman: Dawn of Justice (2016)
 Zack Snyder's Justice League (2021)
Zeitgeist
Zeitgeist: The Movie (2007) (V)
Zeitgeist: Addendum (2008) (V)
Zeitgeist: Moving Forward (2011) (V)
 Zenon
 Zenon: Girl of the 21st Century (1999) (TV)
 Zenon: The Zequel (2001) (TV)
 Zenon: Z3 (2004) (TV)
 Zorro (1958-1962) 
 El Zorro escarlata en la venganza del ahorcado (1958)
 El zorro escarlata en diligencia fantasma (1959)
 El Zorro Vengador (1962)
 Zorro (1969-1971)
 Zorro's Latest Adventure (1969)
 Zorro, Rider of Vengeance (1971)
 Zorro the Invincible (1971)

Notes

References

03